Borucin  is a village in the administrative district of Gmina Krzanowice, within Racibórz County, Silesian Voivodeship, in southern Poland, close to the Czech border.

The village has a population of 1,300.

Gallery

References

Borucin